Trevor Thomas (born ) is the world's only professional long-distance blind hiker and  has hiked over  solo. He was the first blind person to complete the Appalachian Trail on an unassisted solo hike, in 2008. He hikes with a guide dog, and uses sophisticated digital technology, emailing his route to his phone to convert to audible sections, using echo location to identify obstacles, and having a satellite beacon which updates his Facebook page with his location every 10 minutes: if he is in the wrong place or not making the expected progress his expedition coordinator is alerted.  He supports himself through speaking, writing, blogging and sponsorship, and has set up the Team FarSight Foundation to support young blind people in outdoor activities.

He has hiked the Pacific Crest Trail, the Tahoe Rim Trail, the John Muir Trail, Long Trail, the Colorado Trail, and the North Carolina's Mountain to Sea Trail.  He has climbed to the summits of Mt. Mitchell, Mt. Rose, Mt. Whitney, Mt. Elbert, and Mt. Friel.

Thomas lost his sight at age 36.

Guide dogs
Thomas's first guide dog was Tennille, who was born 27 November 2010 and accompanied him from 2012 until she retired in 2018. In 2016 she was said to be "currently the only dual mode dog capable of performing backcountry guide work in addition to her standard guiding duties".

His new dog is Honolulu or Lulu. They met in October 2018. , Thomas was training Lulu for her new role.

References

External links

Team FarSight Foundation website

1960s births
Year of birth missing (living people)
Living people
Hikers
Long distance walkers
Sportspeople with a vision impairment
American mountain climbers